{ 
The General History of Latin America is part of UNESCO’s General and Regional Histories Collection.  The publication seeks to contribute to mutual understanding and dialogue between cultures and civilizations. This series seeks to illustrate the encounters between cultures across history and their respective contributions to the general progress of humankind. This is done through the promotion of a pluralist vision of history.  

The texts were posted online on the UNESCO website, but as of May 2022, that website lists them as no longer available. They are apparently not archived anywhere.

Objectives and main themes 
The General History of Latin America approaches the historical evolution of Latin America in order to capture both the unity and the diversity of the region, highlighting contributions made by Latin American societies (indigenous and others). Coordinated and directed by UNESCO and an International Scientific Committee consisting of 240 prominent researchers and scholars from all over the world, the outcome of this project has been the publication of nine volumes of comprehensive studies and information on ideas, civilizations, societies, and institutions covering the development of Latin American societies from the pre-Columbian era  to the twentieth century. Using methodologies current in historiography, the project focuses on  indigenous Latin American societies, their contacts with European culture, the colonial orders, and the participation of African communities in the region to highlight the history of inter-continental interactions in Latin America.

Published in Spanish and launched in 1983, the fundamental aim of the General History of Latin America, is to help heighten the historical awareness of the region.

History 
As a central part of its mandate, UNESCO is committed to promoting mutual understanding and to facilitating discussion and dialogue amongst peoples and nations. The General History of Latin America makes a significant contribution to this objective. This project was initially suggested in the recommendations of a meeting of experts convened by the Director-General of UNESCO in Lima, Peru, in 1967. In 1983 a Drafting Committee of 21 members (two-thirds of whom were specialists from Latin America) was established and the project was completed in 2009.

Volumes 
 Volume I: The Indigenous Societies (Las Sociedades Originarias)
Edited by Teresa Rojas Rabiela and John V. Murra
 Volume II: Early Contact and the Creation of New Societies (El Primer Contacto y la Formación de Nuevas Sociedades)
Edited by Franklin Pease, G.Y. and Frank Moya Pons
 Volume III: Consolidation of the Colonial Order (Consolidación del Orden Colonial)
Edited by Alfredo Castillero Calvo and Allan Kuethe
 Volume IV: American Processes Towards Colonial Redefinition (Procesos Americanos Hacia la Redefinición Colonial)
Edited by Enrique Tandeter and Jorge Hidalgo Lehuedé
 Volume V: The Structural Crisis in Societies (La Crisis Estructural de las Sociedades Implantadas)
Edited by Germán Carrera Damas and John V. Lombardi
 Volume VI: The Construction of the Latin American Nations (La Construcción de las Naciones Latinoamericanas)
Edited by Josefina Zoraida Vázquez and Manuel Miño Grijalva
 Volume VII: National Latin American Projects: Instruments and Articulation (1870–1930) (Los Proyectos Nacionales Latinoamericanos: Sus Instrumentos y Articulación (1870–1930))
Edited by Enrique Ayala Mora and Eduardo Posada Carbó
 Volume VIII: Latin America Since 1930 (América Latina Desde 1930)
Edited by Marco Palacios and Gregorio Weinberg
 Volume IX: Theory and Methodology in the History of Latin America (Teoraí y Detodología en la Historia de América Latina)
Edited by Estevão de Rezende Martins and Héctor Pérez Brignoli

External links
 UNESCO
 The UNESCO General and Regional Histories: A Contribution to the Rapprochement of Cultures
 UNESCO – The General History of Latin America
 UNESCO General History of Latin America – Preface
 First Meeting of the Bureau of the International Scientific Committee for the Drafting of a General History of Latin America
 The UNESCO Courier, History of Peoples – Recasting the Past, Number 8, 2009

20th-century history books
Latin American studies
Books about Latin America